The Episcopal Diocese of Iowa is the diocese of the Episcopal Church in the United States of America which covers all of Iowa. It is in Province VI. Its offices are in Des Moines, and it has two cathedrals: the Cathedral Church of St. Paul in Des Moines and Trinity Cathedral in Davenport.

History

The Episcopal Church in Iowa can trace its roots to 1836 when services were held occasionally in Dubuque by Richard F. Cadle.  He was followed by E. G. Gear and J. Batchelder. Philander Chase, Bishop of Illinois, visited Scott County in the fall of 1837.

The church started to develop across the state of Iowa.  In July, 1853, Jackson Kemper, missionary bishop of the Northwest, invited clergy and representatives of all the congregations in the state to meet at Trinity Church in Muscatine.  On Wednesday, August 17, Alfred Louderback, rector of Trinity Church, Davenport, was elected chairman in the bishop's absence.  The constitutions and canons for the diocese were adopted and plans were made for the election of a bishop.  The General Convention of the Protestant Episcopal Church in the United States of America admitted the Diocese of Iowa to its membership in October, 1853.

On May 31, 1854, the first convention of the Diocese of Iowa began in Trinity Church, Davenport.  Henry Washington Lee, rector of St. Luke's Church, Rochester, New York, was elected the first bishop of Iowa.  He was consecrated in his church in Rochester on October 18, 1854. Lee preached in the diocese for the first time on October 29, 1854, in St. John's Church, Dubuque.

The cornerstone for Trinity Cathedral, then called Grace Cathedral, was laid in 1867. The building was completed in 1873.  It is the second church built as a cathedral in the Episcopal Church in the United States.  In 1992 St. Paul's Church in Des Moines was named the diocese's liturgical cathedral and Trinity was maintained as its historic cathedral.  Trinity, St. Paul's and 18 other Episcopal churches in Iowa are listed on the National Register of Historic Places.

Coat of arms
The present Coat of Arms for the Diocese of Iowa were designed by Cram and Ferguson  and approved at the 1946 Diocesan Convention.  The arms consist of the a field of green, which represents Iowa's prairies, bisected by two lines that represent the Mississippi River and the Missouri River.  The gold cross contains five red diamonds which represent the five communities where the Episcopal Church in Iowa was organized: Dubuque, Davenport, Muscatine, Burlington, and Keokuk.  The cross is surrounded by four ears of corn that represents Iowa's agricultural heritage. A bishop's mitre tops the shield and it is surrounded by the words, "Seal of the Diocese of Iowa 1853."

Companion Dioceses

  The Diocese of Brechin is part of the Scottish Episcopal Church and is located in North East Scotland. It is the smallest of the seven dioceses in Scotland. The cathedral and administrative offices are in Dundee.  The two dioceses entered into companion status in 1982 and it was officially recognized by the Episcopal Church (US) in 1990.
  The Diocese of Swaziland is located in southern Africa, and encompasses the entire country of Swaziland.  The diocese is part of the Anglican Church of Southern Africa.  The two dioceses entered into companion status in 1988 and it was officially recognized by the Episcopal Church (US) in 1990.

 The Diocese of Nzara is situated in the southwest corner of the new Republic of South Sudan.  It is a member of the Episcopal Church of Sudan.  The two dioceses entered into companion status in October 2012.

Bishops

References

External links

Journal of the Annual Convention, Diocese of Iowa

 
Iowa
Diocese of Iowa
Religious organizations established in 1853
Anglican dioceses established in the 19th century
1853 establishments in Iowa
Province 6 of the Episcopal Church (United States)